Tyler Mitchell may refer to:

 Tyler Mitchell (musician) (born 1958), American jazz musician
 Tyler Mitchell (photographer), American photographer

See also 
 Tyler-Jane Mitchel, New Zealand actress
 Taylor Mitchell (1990–2009), Canadian country folk singer